Saad Al Thyab (Arabic سعد الذياب, born 22 November 1985) is a Saudi Arabian football player who currently plays as a defender for Al-Hilal.

References 

Saudi Arabian footballers
Association football defenders
1985 births
Living people
Al-Taraf Club players
Al Hilal SFC players
Ettifaq FC players
Saudi Professional League players